Crypsithyris immolata is a moth in the  family Tineidae. It was described by Edward Meyrick in 1931. It is found in India.

References

Natural History Museum Lepidoptera generic names catalog

Moths described in 1931
Tineinae